Jintotolo is an island within the Jintotolo Channel, part of the Province of Masbate, Philippines. It constitutes two barangays of the Municipality of Balud (Barangays Cantil and Jintotolo) and has a population of 3,574 persons in the 2015 census.

See also

 List of islands of the Philippines

References

Islands of Masbate